is a maze video game by Capcom originally released in 1984 as a coin-operated arcade game. The gameplay is similar to that of the 1982 Sega arcade game Pengo, but with the arctic theme replaced with that of a pirate ship.

The game was later included in the 1998 compilation Capcom Generations: The First Generation for the PlayStation (in Japan and Europe) and Sega Saturn (Japan only). Like the other games in the Capcom Generations titles, it was included in the 2005 compilation Capcom Classics Collection for the PlayStation 2 and Xbox, and in the PlayStation Portable version Capcom Classics Collection: Reloaded, which was the first time the game was released for home consoles in North America.

Gameplay

The player controls a Japanese sailor by the name of Momotaro, who must use barrels to defeat the titular pirate crew.  Momotaro has no attacks of his own.  However, he has the ability to grab barrels, drums, large bags, and various other items which he can throw (either horizontally or vertically) across the screen.  Any pirate who stands in the way of a barrel or other object will be hurled off the screen.  Barrels that impact the walls of a stage or other barrels or objects will shatter and produce points, while other objects are invulnerable (but do not produce points).  Each successive enemy that is hit by a barrel will yield additional points once the barrel is destroyed.  In addition, there are also various items hidden beneath barrels in each level which will give Momotaro bonus points.  Every floor of the ship has a set number of pirates to be destroyed, as well as a single "Bow", a special pirate that regenerates each time it is defeated.  Every fourth level in the game yields a bonus level in which the barrels are worth an increased number of points, and a group of enemies entirely made up of Bows (which do not regenerate in this case). 

With each successive floor, the speed and intelligence of the pirates increases.  For every sixteen barrels Momotaro destroys, he will be rewarded with an item that grants invincibility for a limited amount of time, allowing him to defeat enemies by simply touching them.  Momotaro's enemies do not have attacks, but a single touch from an enemy will cause him to die and be revived, costing the player one extra life; the game ends when the player runs out of lives. When a player has scored more than 1 million points, the game will stop awarding the player with bonus lives. The game has no ending and loops indefinitely after level sixteen. The enemy patterns and color will reset to level one but the game will not reset the deck counter. The layout of the barrels on the stages will continue to change, however, and the enemy count per level will not reset to level one counts.

Characters 

Momotaro: a sailor.  Momotaro is on his own against the Higemaru pirates, only receiving help from various items laden throughout each floor.
Higemaru: a bearded pirate wearing a bandana and striped shirt, and lacking arms and legs (propelled only by a pair of large feet).  Comes in a wide assortment of colors.  They tend to stay near areas where they spawn, then move cautiously about the level, stopping every so often.  Later on, however, they will actively chase Momotaro and attempt to trap him.
Bow: presumably, the captain of the Higemaru pirates.  Sports a beard, a hat with a skull and crossbones emblazoned on it, a hook, and a wooden leg.  Wanders aimlessly around the deck.

Legacy 

Pirate Ship Higemaru was the third game produced by Capcom, following Vulgus and Sonson.  One of three Capcom games to use Z80-based technology, along with 1942 and Exed Exes.
The Yashichi, an item that frequently appears in Capcom games (especially those of the late 1980s and early 1990s) makes its second cameo appearance here.  This is also the second game in which it appears as an item, following Sonson.  Prior to this, it had appeared as an enemy in Vulgus.
In Namco × Capcom, Sylphie, the item shop girl from Forgotten Worlds whose attacks are all taken from various Capcom games, has an attack in which she throws a barrel in the same style as Momotaro, a clear reference to Pirate Ship Higemaru.
A sequel to Higemaru, titled Makaijima, was released for the Family Computer and MSX2 in Japan.  This game retains much of the look of the original, and many similar gameplay elements such as the ability to pick up and throw barrels at enemies, and the return of Momotaro and the pirates.  However, the game features much more diverse gameplay such as the ability to traverse a map screen via ship, levels taking place on islands, and giant bosses, as well as a more developed plot.  Hebi Island, one of the stages in Makaijima, features the enemy characters from Ghosts 'n Goblins.  An English localization of this sequel was planned titled Makai Island, which was canceled, but which prototype is found and now playable via an emulator.
A Stage 3 enemy boss character featuring in Capcom's Strider is a pirate named Captain Higemaru Jr (Captain Beard Jr).
On the Capcom Fighters Network website, there are profiles of Momotaru, Bow, and Beard from Higeru Makaijima, depicted as siblings. Additionally, Momotaru was originally planned to be playable in Street Fighter V but was scrapped for Birdie.

References

External links

1984 video games
Arcade video games
Capcom franchises
Capcom games
Maze games
Mobile games
PlayStation Network games
Xbox 360 Live Arcade games
Video game clones
Video games developed in Japan
Video games about pirates